The Solution Movement (MEMO) is a political party founded in 2021 led by entrepreneur György Gattyán. The party was formed for the 2022 Hungarian parliamentary election, in which it managed to achieve only 1%.

History 
György Gattyán's first public appearance was in 2021 in an interview with Gabriella Jakupcsek, in which she testified about her political ambitions. After that, Sándor Friderikusz hinted in his podcast that he was starting a party. He officially announced on 17 December 2021 in ATV that he is creating a party called Megoldás Mozgalom with which he intends to run in the 2022 elections and that he is nominating candidates in all 106 electoral districts.

The party was registered on December 24, 2021, candidates were searched for in job advertisements.

Program 
The Megoldás Mozgalom program was initially not open to the public, the program points were uploaded in the form of small cards to their website and various social media platforms. These include, among other things, the introduction of the concept of an economic public actor, the maximization of the tenure of the position of prime minister and the transformation of the TAO system.

Their program, which was later made public, treated as a top priority the creation of a "guarantee system" for Hungary to move into the 21st century, by creating and operating an economic, social and welfare framework appropriate to the age.

Criticism 
In public life, the establishment of the Solution Movement provoked sharp debates.

After the announcement of the founding of the party, the opposition political alliance United for Hungary immediately accused the Gattyáns of electoral collusion with Fidesz, stating that if the party's goal had really been a change of government, it should have fielded its candidates in the 2021 opposition primary. The opposition has also criticized that Gattyán's party is actually a sham party whose aim is to confuse opposition voters and divide their votes, thereby helping Fidesz-KDNP in the election.

Complicity with the governing parties was also believed to be seen in the fact that in March 2020, the Central Investigative Department of the National Crime Directorate of the National Investigation Agency (NAV) seized the building owned by Gattyán at Andrássy út for a value of HUF 14 billion 187 million. The seizure was lifted on December 7, 2021 by the NAV , and this happened immediately after Gattyán announced his political involvement. The parties of the opposition coalition also saw their accusations confirmed in the NAV decision favorable to Gattyán.

In his interviews, the party chairman repeatedly denied that he had a relationship with the governing parties.

The prominent role played by its leader, György Gattyán, in the international sex industry was a recurring criticism of the movement. Gattyán was listed as the 6th richest person in Hungary on the Forbes Hungary list published in 2022, his fortune estimated at HUF 253.8 billion was largely derived from the income of his erotic sex cam service called LiveJasmin.

Leadership 

 György Gattyán (president), ranked 6th on the Forbes 50 list in 2021 with a fortune of HUF 245.6 billion
 Dr. Péter Szatmári (Chairman of the Program Board)
 Dr. Krisztina Bajusz (Vice President for social and social affairs)
 Gábor Borsányi (Vice President for sports and ;leisure)
 Viktor Huszár (Vice President for digitization)

Electoral results

Aftermath 
The founder of the party did not expect a simple, but a qualitative, two-thirds victory in the parliamentary elections. Compared to this, MEMO's success in the national voting was finally achieved by obtaining 58,929 votes and a result of over 1 percent (1.04 %). With this, Gattyán achieved that his party did not have to repay the money received for their campaign to the state. In addition until 2026, they became entitled to 50-60 million forints per year in party funding.

References 

Political parties in Hungary
Political parties established in 2021